Bob Pattillo is an entrepreneur and founder of Gray Ghost Ventures, Gray Matters Capital, First Light Ventures, GMC Ratings, GGMF, ISFC, and IDEX and co-founder of Bellwether Fund, ASA Intl, and Village Capital. Gray Matters Capital (GMC) is an Impact Investing Enterprise that actively invests in education for low income students in emerging markets. GMC's mission is an education leading to a purpose filled life for 100 million women.

He has served as an adviser to global investors and foundations. His funds and/or investments have participated in sales of RentBureau / Experian, Movirtu / BlackBerry Limited, Cell Bazaar / Telenor.  His interviews are featured by SOCAP  and Emory University

Career
In real estate, he took over a family business, then founded Robert Pattillo Properties in 1994 and pioneered the "STCDE" shell, a spec building concept that took Robert Pattillo Properties to 8th on the list of the largest industrial developers in the United States.  He began working in microfinance in 1998 and sold a 54-year-old business in 2003 from the influence of his 11-year-old daughter to focus solely on impact investment and enterprise development.

In 2001, Pattillo founded the Gray Ghost Microfinance Fund, a $69m fund that focuses on regional equity microfinance funds that supply start-up and expansion capital to microfinance institutions around the world. In 2016 according to a report by BCorp four of the top five impact funds over the last 14 years were led by investments from GGMF.

In 2006, Pattillo began investing in social enterprise through his Gray Matters Capital Foundation, and in 2008 he invested in Gray Ghost DOEN Social Ventures Coöperatief, alongside the DOEN Foundation. The portfolio includes d.light, MKopa, and BKash.  In its work in social ventures, he has coinvested alongside Acumen Fund, the Omidyar Network, and Shell Foundation. Pattillo helped found Village Capital and IDEX.

Awards and recognition

Pattillo has been named one of Forbes' Top 30 social entrepreneurs of 2011. He has also served as a Director of Accion International, Microvest, ASA International, Antares, Mix Markets, d.light, Council for Microfinance Equity Funds, and the Indian School Finance Company.  He was the Keynote Speaker at SOCAP, Sanabel,  The UN Conference on Microfinance (with Kofi Annan), Goldman Sachs Global Partners meeting, Accion Global Conference, and Consortium Launch (with Bill Clinton).

References

External links 
 Gray Matters Capital
 First Light India Accelerator
 Village Capital
 Global Impact Investing Network
 Bob Pattillo Creativity Conversation, Emory University
 Bob Pattillo SOCAP Interview
 Stanford Social Innovation Review, Private Schools for the Poor
 Harvard Business Review, Creating Shared Value

Social entrepreneurs
Microfinance people
Living people
Businesspeople from Atlanta
Year of birth missing (living people)